Garw is a Welsh toponym meaning "rugged" and may refer to:

 River Garw, a river in South Wales
 Garw Valley, the community along the river valley
 Nantgarw, a village in Rhondda Cynon Taff
 Garw S.B.G.C., a football club based in the Garw Valley